The Seven Carries is an historic canoe route from Paul Smith's Hotel to the Saranac Inn through what is now known as the Saint Regis Canoe Area in southern Franklin County, New York in the Adirondack Park. The route was famous with sportsmen and tourists from major east-coast cities from the late 19th century through the 1930s; interest has revived in recent years. Despite the name, the route consists of only six carries, or portages.

It used to connect two popular Adirondack hotels— Paul Smith's Hotel, built in 1859 and burned in 1930, now the site of Paul Smith's College, and the Saranac Inn, built in 1864 and burned in 1978, now the site of a public golf course and a small hamlet.

From Saranac Inn, the route traditionally started via a horse-drawn wagon ride to Little Green Pond. Today, after a short drive over the Fish Hatchery Road from NY-30, one can put in on Little Green and then carry  to Little Clear Pond, or put in directly on Little Clear. Little Clear is used by the State Fish Hatchery, and no fishing or camping is allowed.

Next is a  carry to  Little Long Pond. Finally, the two less than  carries and an equally short paddle across Bog Pond (no longer in the Canoe Area) bring one to Upper Saint Regis Lake, home of many Adirondack Great Camps, including Camp Topridge.

Upper Saint Regis Lake connects to Spitfire Lake and Lower Saint Regis Lake, the site of Paul Smith's Hotel,  from the end of the last carry. Alternatively, one can take out at the Saint Regis Carry in the southeast corner of Lower Saint Regis,  from the end of the last carry

There are campsites on Saint Regis, Green, Little Long, and Bear Ponds.

External links
Adirondack Sports and Fitness -  Wilderness Paddling in the St. Regis Canoe Area
New York Times, "SUNSHINE AND PICNICS.; A Combination Saranac Sojourners Are Playing to the Limit", last paragraph, August 5, 1906
New York Times, "IT'S IN THE FAMILY.; Roosevelt's Eight-Year-Old Nephew Catches an 11-Pound Pike", fourth paragraph, August 26, 1906

Adirondacks
Transportation in Franklin County, New York
Tourist attractions in Franklin County, New York
Paul Smiths, New York